The Louisville and Nashville Depot, or Louisville and Nashville Railroad Depot or Louisville and Nashville Passenger Station, Louisville and Nashville Railroad Passenger Depot or variations, may refer to the following former and active train stations previously used by the Louisville and Nashville Railroad.  Some of these are listed on the National Register of Historic Places (NRHP).

Alabama
Birmingham, Alabama (L&N station)
Louisville and Nashville Railroad Depot (Cullman, Alabama)
Louisville and Nashville Depot (Evergreen, Alabama)
Louisville and Nashville Depot (Mobile, Alabama)
Montgomery Union Station

Florida
Louisville and Nashville Depot (Chipley, Florida) (a.k.a.; "Bill Lee Station")
Louisville and Nashville Depot (DeFuniak Springs, Florida), currently part of the Walton County Heritage Museum
Louisville and Nashville Depot (Milton, Florida)
Louisville and Nashville Station (Pensacola, Florida)

Georgia
Louisville and Nashville Depot (Dalton, Georgia)
Louisville and Nashville Depot (Marietta, Georgia)

Illinois
Louisville and Nashville Depot (Nashville, Illinois)

Indiana
Louisville and Nashville Railroad Station (Evansville, Indiana)

Kentucky
Louisville and Nashville Railroad Passenger Depot (Berea, Kentucky), listed on the NRHP in Madison County, Kentucky
Louisville and Nashville Railroad Station (Bowling Green, Kentucky)
Louisville and Nashville Passenger Depot (Carlisle, Kentucky), listed on the NRHP in Kentucky
Louisville and Nashville Railroad Depot (Harlan, Kentucky), formerly listed on the NRHP in Harlan County, Kentucky
Louisville and Nashville Railroad Depot (Henderson, Kentucky), listed on the NRHP in Kentucky
Hopkinsville L & N Railroad Depot (Hopkinsville, Kentucky)
Stanford L&N Railroad Depot, Stanford, Kentucky

Mississippi
Bay St. Louis station, Bay St. Louis, Mississippi, in a building designated a Mississippi landmark
Pascagoula (Amtrak station), Pascagoula, Mississippi, which includes the Louisville and Nashville Railroad Depot
Louisville and Nashville Railroad Depot at Ocean Springs, Ocean Springs, Mississippi, listed on the NRHP in Jackson County, Mississippi

Tennessee
Chattanooga Union Station
L & N Train Station (Clarksville, Tennessee)
Louisville and Nashville Freight Depot (Knoxville, Tennessee), listed on the NRHP in Knox County, Tennessee
L&N Station (Knoxville), NRHP-listed as "Louisville and Nashville Passenger Station"
Memphis Union Station
Nashville Union Station

See also
Louisville and Nashville Railroad Office Building, Louisville, Kentucky
Mitchellsburg Louisville and Nashville Railroad Culvert, Mitchellsburg, Kentucky, listed on the NRHP in Boyle County, Kentucky
Louisville and Nashville Combine Car Number 665, New Haven, Kentucky